Escadrille Spa.82 (also known as Escadrille N.82) was a French fighter squadron active during the First World War years of 1917 and 1918. The squadron served, at various times, on the Western and Italian Fronts, as well as in Flanders. By war's end, the squadron was credited with 26 confirmed aerial victories.

History
Escadrille Spa.82 (also known as Escadrille N.82) was formed in January 1917. It was outfitted with a variety of Nieuports and SPADs. It would not be operational until 7 July 1917, when it was tasked to III Armee. In November, it was transferred south to oppose both Romanian and Italian forces. In April 1918, the squadron was returned to the Western Front.

On 27 August 1918, Escadrille Spa.82 was one of four squadrons consolidated into Groupe de Combat 23. On 22 September, the Groupe moved to Flanders until the Armistice on 11 November 1918.

Escadrille Spa.82 was credited with destroying 26 enemy aircraft.

Commanding officers

 Lieutenant Raoul Echard: January 1917 until mid-1918
 Lieutenant Marie Lecoq De Kerland: 6 June 1918 until war's end

Notable members

 Lieutenant Raoul Echard
 Lieutenant Marie Lecoq De Kerland
 Lieutenant François de Boigne

Aircraft

 An assortment of Nieuport and SPAD fighters.

End notes

Reference

 Franks, Norman; Bailey, Frank (1993). Over the Front: The Complete Record of the Fighter Aces and Units of the United States and French Air Services, 1914–1918 London, UK: Grub Street Publishing. .

Fighter squadrons of the French Air and Space Force
Military units and formations established in 1917
Military units and formations disestablished in 1918
Military units and formations of France in World War I
Military aviation units and formations in World War I